Acrotaeniostola fuscinotum is a species of tephritid or fruit flies in the genus Acrotaeniostola of the family Tephritidae.

Distribution
Myanmar, Vietnam.

References

Tephritinae
Insects described in 1938
Diptera of Asia